= Ernest Feleppa =

Electrical engineer in New York City, US

Ernest Feleppa is an electrical engineer at the Riverside Research Institute of Biomedicine in New York City. He was named a Fellow of the Institute of Electrical and Electronics Engineers (IEEE) in 2015 for his contributions to ultrasound imaging medical applications.
